The Prisoner is a 2009 six-part television miniseries based on the 1960s TV series The Prisoner. The series concerned a man who awakens in a mysterious, picturesque, but escape-proof village, and stars Jim Caviezel, Sir Ian McKellen, Ruth Wilson, and Hayley Atwell. It was co-produced by American cable network AMC with British channel ITV, which now holds the rights to the original series. It received mixed reviews, with critics feeling that the remake was not as compelling as the original series.

Plot
The series begins with an unidentified man waking up in the middle of a desert and finding himself witness to the pursuit of an elderly man by mysterious guards. The old man dies soon after, but not before asking the younger man to "tell 'them' I got out."

Soon, he arrives in an enigmatic community, referred to by its many residents as simply "The Village". Everyone he meets is nameless, but known instead by a number; he is disconcertingly familiar to them, and learns his own number is "6". Everybody he meets appears ignorant of the outside world, and the contradictions this creates in some of their thoughts.

Number 6 also appears unable to remember his real name, and recalls only brief flashes of his former life in New York City. One recurring proto-memory is having met and seduced a mysterious woman in a diner - implicitly this happened very shortly before his awakening in The Village. He finds himself locked in a battle of wills against an individual called Number 2, who appears to be the Village's leader and who goes to great lengths to make Number 6 assimilate.

Number 6, meanwhile, tries to connect with "dreamers" — Village residents who, like him, have been experiencing dreamlike memories of their lives outside of the Village. Although distrusting of all villagers, he does befriend Number 147, a Village taxi driver, and Number 313, a doctor with whom he develops a romantic connection.

Number 2 invites Number 6 to spy on his fellow villagers under the tutelage of Number 909. Each man investigates the other and 2 investigates both - it appears as if all the villagers are spying on each other and privy to one another's foibles. Number 2's son, Number 11-12, is meeting secretly with 909, and feels compelled to cover up these interactions by literally stabbing him in the back.

As Number 6's memories return piecemeal, his former name (Michael) is revealed in apparent flashback, as are a series of encounters between him in New York and many of the villagers. It appears that Michael used to work for a secretive surveillance company, Summakor, from which he (like McGoohan's spy in the original series) had recently resigned.

Number 2 has a heavily-medicated wife, and a son - Number 11-12. His son also feels like a prisoner, and Number 6's influence leads him to question his own identity, sexuality and - prompted by 6's unwillingness to conform - even the reality of his existence. Michael's feelings about his casual liaison with the now-better-recalled Lucy prior to his awakening in the Village resurfaces when he is matched by a Village agency with his onsite soulmate, and she turns out to be the same woman. Lucy now calls herself Number 4-15, is blind and initially claims no memory of their previous encounter. Number 2 manipulates 313 into betraying 6's relationship by making her own feelings for him clear, even as mysterious sinkholes open up throughout the Village into which several inhabitants fall.

Number 6 and Number 2 engage in a psychological battle involving their doppelgangers, but their final showdown reveals their doubles to be unreal - either imagined or hallucinated, bringing 11-12's concerns about the very fabric of reality to the fore, and further his existential crisis.

The final episode sees Number 2 discuss Number 313's returning memories of being Sarah, an alleged mentally disturbed woman in Michael's reality. Heavy flashbacks detail Michael's meeting with his presumed superior, Mr. Curtis; Number 147 is his driver, and the two discus brainwashing enroute to Mr Curtis, the 'real' identity of Number 2. The time relationship of the memories is questioned - Number 6 tells Number 147 that their minds are being trapped while their bodies are elsewhere, suggesting myriad interpretations of the layers of reality.

Mr. Curtis introduces Michael to his wife, Helen Blake, who has being theorising about different levels of consciousness and whether it is possible to visit them, "tak[ing] with us all these broken people and let[ting] them fix themselves" in a situation focusing on the fundamentals of life. The Villagers are revealed to have been subjects of Michael, identified by his surveillance work.

The Village exists in Helen's mind, a precarious existence threatened when Number 11-12 - having previously adjusted his mother's medication - assists in her suicide-death. Number 6 appears to be dying, sealing his fate and inability to escape. His planned funeral, however, is replaced with that of 11-12, who takes his own life. As Number 2's fictional perfect family life - and Village - crumble, he expresses a desire to cede control to Number 6-Michael, inviting Number 147 to support 6 as 'the One' capable of bringing clarity and morality to the Village - "freedom within the prison."

Mr. Curtis praises Michael's integrity, as he identifies people - including 909 and 554 - who have been 'fixed' by the Village, further confusing the timeframe of interactions and overlap between the parallel narratives. Number 2 explains to 6 that it his fear of leaving that manifests as Rover (the odd white ball that acts as boundary-keeper to the Village environs).

Number 6 pleads with Number 2 to release the villagers before they succumb to the holes tearing apart the Village; instead he reveals a version of the truth - that they are all prisoners - as Michael learns about Sarah, who also resisted the Village and sacrificed her sanity.

In New York, Michael agrees to help Curtis save Sarah; in the Village Number 147 leads the villagers to anoint Michael-6 as 'the one' to save it alongside Sarah-313, the dreamer capable of making the sacrifice to help him sustain the unreality and try to make a 'good Village'.

Cast

Main cast
 Ian McKellen as Number 2 / Curtis
 Jim Caviezel as Number 6 / Michael
 Ruth Wilson as Number 313 / Sarah
 Jamie Campbell Bower as 11–12
 Hayley Atwell as 4–15 / Lucy
 Rachael Blake as M2
 Lennie James as Number 147
 Renate Stuurman as 21-16

Guest cast
 John Whiteley as Number 93 – Episode 1, "Arrival"
 Jessica Haines as Number 554 – Episode 1, "Arrival"
 David Butler as Number 37927 / The Access Man – Episode 1, "Arrival" and Episode 5, "Schizoid"
 Jeffrey R. Smith as Number 16 – Episode 2, "Harmony"
 James Cunigham as Number 70 & Shadow Number 70 – Episode 2, "Harmony"
 Leila Henriques as The Winking Woman – Episode 2, "Harmony"
 Vincent Regan as Number 909 – Episode 3, "Anvil"
 Warrick Grier as Number 1955 – Episode 3, "Anvil"
 Lauren Dasnev as Number 1100 – Episode 3, "Anvil"
 Sara Stewart as Number 1894 – Episode 4, "Darling"

Production

Background
A remake of the 1967 TV series The Prisoner had been in the works since 2005.

The miniseries was promoted at 2008 San Diego ComicCon via a skywriter airplane that sketched the phrase "Seek the Six" in the sky over San Diego. Although "Seek the Six" was initially thought to be a catchphrase of some sort, it did not appear in the final cut of the miniseries.

A further promotional event for the miniseries was held at the 2009 ComicCon, including a spoiler-heavy, 9-minute trailer and a cast and crew discussion panel.

Development
The Prisoner went into production in June 2008. Location filming for The Village was in Swakopmund, Namibia. A production diary is available. After 18 weeks of shooting, principal photography wrapped on December 12, 2008.

In an interview shortly after his death, Patrick McGoohan's widow said that producers of the new series had hoped that McGoohan would play a part in the revival: They wanted Patrick to have some part in it, but he adamantly didn't want to be involved. He had already done it.

This was contradicted by Ian McKellen in an interview featured in the November 2009 edition of SFX Magazine where he was quoted as saying:

Producer Trevor Hopkins confirmed in an interview that he had invited McGoohan to play the role of the Number Six-like old man encountered by Caviezel's character early in the first episode. This is suggested by the jacket worn by the old man – the same style jacket as worn by Number 6 in the first series. McGoohan declined, but suggested he could play Number 2 instead.

Broadcast 
The series premiered on November 15, 2009, as a miniseries on the AMC TV channel in the United States and Canada. It was also broadcast in the UK by ITV. The six-part series premiered in the UK on April 17, 2010. AMC's website streamed all 17 episodes of the original Prisoner series in advance of showing the remake.

AMC's original airing of the series combined the episodes, with episodes 1 and 2 airing on day 1, etc., with only one set of opening and closing credits for both. ITV broadcast the episodes individually, over six consecutive Saturday nights in the spring of 2010. The DVD release restores the 6-episode format.

Episodes
Each episode title in the series is one word taken from an episode title from the original programme.

Reception

Critical response
The miniseries met with mixed reviews, scoring 46 out of 100 on Metacritic.

Los Angeles Times television critic Robert Lloyd wrote "why anyone, on either side of the screen, should be particularly interested in his fate, is never made clear nor compelling," and further states "the payoff is weak, and more than a bit daffy." In a comparison with the miniseries to AMC's hit series Mad Men, he writes "the difference [is] that 'Mad Men' is never boring."

In Entertainment Weekly, TV critic Ken Tucker writes "it lacks the wit and zip of the original Prisoner," and concludes "It's self-absorbed to the point of incoherence."

Chicago Sun-Times reviewer Paige Wiser declares "There's also a reason why I am not conking myself on the head with a croquet mallet, but The Prisoner somehow has the same effect," and with reference to viewing all six hours of the miniseries, concludes "I urge you to heed my advice: Opt out while you can."

San Francisco Chronicle critic Tim Goodman writes "The Prisoner is not compelling. It rambles too much. Its vagaries are not interesting, its unorthodox storytelling not special enough."

The New York Times reviewer Alessandra Stanley struck a contrary note: "This version of The Prisoner is not a remake, it's a clever and engaging reinterpretation by Bill Gallagher, who shaped the script to contemporary tastes and sensibilities — notably, a postmodern fatigue with ideology and big thoughts."  She concludes "The 21st century adaptation pays only lip service to the human condition, and instead explores a power struggle between two human beings. It's unlikely to prove as lasting, but the new series still manages to be thrilling." Furthermore, it was positively reviewed in the Radio Times and also by Sam Wallaston who, writing for The Guardian, described it as "a triumph with something of The Truman Show about it" with "a tension and a claustrophobia that gnaw away at you, making you look at your own psyche."

Awards and nominations

Home media

DVD
In early 2010, Warner Home Video released The Prisoner in DVD format in Region 1/USA & Canada in a 3-disc collection.

Special features included deleted scenes for all episodes (including scenes from "Arrival" that explicitly indicate that 2 orders the bombing of the diner), and commentaries on "Arrival" and "Checkmate".

Featurettes in the set include:
 "A 6 Hour Film Shot in 92 Days: The Diary of the Prisoner" – behind-the-scenes documentary on the making of the series, featuring footage previously available online.
 "Beautiful Prison: The World of the Prisoner" – a second behind-the-scenes documentary.
 "The Prisoner ComicCon Panel" – Jim Caviezel, Lennie James, Bill Gallagher, and others discuss the then-upcoming series at the 2009 San Diego ComiCon.
 "The Man Behind 2" – Jamie Campbell Bower conducts a tongue-in-cheek interview with his TV father, Ian McKellen.

ITV Studios Home Entertainment released a UK DVD and Blu-ray Disc on 3 May 2010. The listed extras include the deleted scenes, ComicCon panel and McKellen interview, but differ otherwise. They include:
 "The Making of" for all six episodes
 "Inside The Prisoner" for all six episodes
 The Prisoner Read Through
 Character Profiles

References

External links

 The Prisoner at AMCTV.com
 

2009 American television series debuts
2009 American television series endings
2009 British television series debuts
AMC (TV channel) original programming
2000s American television miniseries
Films shot in Namibia
The Prisoner
English-language television shows